The Yalmy River is a perennial river of the Snowy River catchment, located in the Alpine region of the Australian state of Victoria.

Course and features
The Yalmy River rises in a valley in a remote alpine wilderness area that forms the boundary between the Snowy River National Park and the Yalmy State Forest, and flows generally south, then west, then south, then south by west, joined by three minor tributaries, before reaching its confluence with the Rodger River east of Hicks camp site within the national park in the Shire of East Gippsland. The river descends  over its  course.

The entire course of the river is contained within, or forms the eastern boundary of the Snowy River National Park.

The traditional custodians of the land surrounding the Yalmy River are the Australian Aboriginal Bidawal and Nindi-Ngudjam Ngarigu Monero peoples.

See also

 List of rivers of Australia

References

External links
 
 
 
 

East Gippsland catchment
Rivers of Gippsland (region)